Schillerska gymnasiet is an upper secondary school located in Vasastan, in the central parts of Gothenburg, Sweden. It was first established in 1866 as Göteborgs Högre Realläroverk.

Notable students
 Sture Allén, professor of Computational Linguistics
 Joel Alme, musician
 Jenny Berggren, musician
 Linn Berggren, musician, former member of Ace of Base
 Marcus Birro, poet and author
 Peter Birro, script writer
 Tommy Blom, musician
 Reine Brynolfsson, actor
 Olof Dreijer, musician and record producer, member of The Knife
 Oscar Dronjak, musician
 Anton Glanzelius, actor
 Bengt Hallberg, musician
 Jan Hjärpe, professor in Islamic Studies
 Anneli Hulthén, politician
 Magnus Johansson, footballer
 Jens Lekman, musician
 Tomas Lindberg, musician
 Cecilia Malmström. politician
 Kay Pollak, film director
 Gideon Ståhlberg. Chess Grandmaster
 Sven Wollter, actor

References

External links

International Baccalaureate schools in Sweden
Gymnasiums (school) in Sweden
International schools in Sweden
Schools in Stockholm